Lake of Sorrow is the debut studio album by the Norwegian gothic metal band The Sins of Thy Beloved. It was recorded at Sound Suite Studio and released on August 8, 1998 through Napalm Records.

Track listing

Personnel

The Sins of Thy Beloved
Anita Auglend - vocals
Glenn Morten Nordbø - guitars, vocals
Arild Christensen - guitars, vocals
Ingfrid Stensland - keyboards, piano
Anders Thue - keyboards, piano
Ola Aarrestad - bass
Stig Johansen - drums

Additional musicians
Pete Johansen - violin

Production
Terje Refsnes - producer, engineer, mixing with The Sins of Thy Beloved
Tor Søreide - design
Petter Hegre - photography

1998 debut albums
The Sins of Thy Beloved albums
Napalm Records albums